The Pegasus World Cup Invitational Stakes is an American Thoroughbred horse race whose first running was on January 28, 2017 at Gulfstream Park in Hallandale Beach, Florida. It is run over the dirt at the distance of  miles (9 furlongs) and is open to horses four years old and up. The Grade I rating was assumed from the Donn Handicap.

With a purse of $12 million for its inaugural running, the Pegasus World Cup surpassed the Dubai World Cup as the richest horse race in the world for the year 2017 & 2018. The purse of the event rose to $16 million in 2018, but dropped to $9 million in 2019. The fourth running of the Pegasus World Cup in 2020 carried a $3 million purse. The entry fee structure has also changed over time, from $1 million in 2017 and 2018, to $500,000 in 2019 to free in 2020.

Horses carry  with a three-pound allowance for fillies and mares. Between 2017 and 2019, horses that ran without the use of the pre-race medication furosemide (more commonly known as Lasix) received an allowance of five pounds. Starting in 2020, the use of all race-day medications, including Lasix, is prohibited, which the Stronach Group heralded as a "new era" in North American thoroughbred racing.

The race is named for Pegasus, a Greek mythical horse, a 110-foot statue of which stands at Gulfstream Park.

History

Frank Stronach first proposed the idea for the race during the Thoroughbred Owners Conference at Gulfstream in January 2016. His original proposal called for an annual -mile (10 furlong) race to be run at either Gulfstream or Santa Anita Park in mid to late January, which would not interfere with the Breeders' Cup or the Dubai World Cup. The timing also makes it possible for a horse to run one last race before retiring to stud, as the North American breeding season begins in mid-February. "I think racing usually has a little lull this time of year – we have to wait for spring for something to happen", said trainer Bob Baffert in January 2017. "When I heard about the idea last year, I thought wow, American Pharoah probably would have been in there for one more try at it."

The Stronach Group officially announced plans for the race in May 2016, with the distance shortened to  miles (9 furlongs). Under the original format, 12 shareholders each paid $1 million to purchase a position in the gate for a then unspecified horse. The shareholder then had the right to race, lease, contract or share a starter, or sell their place in the gate, and had the first right of refusal for subsequent races. Shareholders also had an equal share in the net income from the race. Each shareholder was permitted to pre-enter two horses. A pre-entered horse that did not draw into the Pegasus World Cup was eligible to compete in the newly created Poseidon Stakes, which was run under similar conditions but offered a $400,000 purse and required a $20,000 entry fee.

The second Pegasus World Cup in 2018 was contested for a higher purse of $16 million, with $1 million from each of the 12 starting positions and an additional $4 million contributed by the Stronach Group.

With the addition of a race on turf, the total prize money for the 2019 event was increased to $17 million. The purse for the original dirt race was reduced to $9 million, with the other $7 million in purse money was allocated to the new Pegasus World Cup Turf race (formerly the Gulfstream Park Turf Handicap), and another $1 million is available as bonus money should an owner win both races. The entry fee was reduced to $500,000, with 24 entries available — 12 in each of the dirt and turf races.

In 2019, the Stronach Group partnered with Xpressbet to host Pegasus World Cup Betting Championship with the total prize of $435,000.

The fourth Pegasus World Cup, to be run on 25 January 2020, will carry a purse of $3 million and require that horses be free of all race-day medications. There will no longer be entry or starting fees, as was the case with the previous runnings. 2% of all purse winnings will be donated to thoroughbred aftercare.

Speed Record

 1:46.83 by 4 3⁄4 lengths Arrogate (2017)

Most Wins

 No horse has won this race more than once

Most wins by a Jockey

 2 – Irad Ortiz Jr. (2020, 2022)

Most wins by a trainer

 2 – Bob Baffert (2017, 2020)

Most wins by an owner

 No owner has won this race more than once.

Winners

References

External links
 Official website

Horse races in Florida
Gulfstream Park
 
Open mile category horse races
Grade 1 stakes races in the United States
Recurring sporting events established in 2017